Duddingtonia is a genus of fungi in the family Orbiliaceae comprising only the species Duddingtonia flagrans.

Synonymy
The species Duddingtonia flagrans has 2 synonymous names:
Arthrobotrys flagrans (Dudd.) Sidorova, Gorlenko & Nalepina
Trichothecium flagrans Dudd.

References
http://www.speciesfungorum.org/Names/SynSpecies.asp?RecordID=330246

Notes

Helotiales
Monotypic Ascomycota genera